Irving Alberti is an actor and humourist from the Dominican Republic.

In 2012, he was elected by Luz García’s Noche de Luz programme as a "Summer’s Hot Body".

Career 

Radio
“Botando el Golpe”
“Parando el Trote”

Television
“Perdone la hora”
“No hay 2 sin 3” (TV Series, 2005 [aired in 2009])
“Chévere Nights” (2011–present)
“Qué chévere es saber”

Theatre
 “Hairspray”
 “Me dejó por Nueva York”
 “Las aventuras de Willie”
 “¡Qué buena es mi suegra!”
 “Blancanieves”
 “Los tres temores”

Filmography

References 

Living people

Dominican Republic television presenters
Dominican Republic male film actors
Dominican Republic male stage actors
Dominican Republic male television actors
Dominican Republic humorists
People from Santo Domingo
Year of birth missing (living people)